Myoporum insulare, commonly known as common boobialla, native juniper, is a species of flowering plant in the figwort family Scrophulariaceae and is endemic to coastal areas of Australia. It is a shrub or small tree which grows on dunes and coastal cliffs, is very salt tolerant and widely used in horticulture.

Description
The leaves are egg-shaped and the upper and lower surfaces are the same dull green colour.

The four stamens usually extend slightly beyond the tube. Peak flowering times are July to February in Western Australia and October to December in south-eastern Australia. Flowering is followed by the fruit which is a smooth, rounded purple to black drupe  in diameter.

Taxonomy and naming
Myoporum insulare was first formally described by botanist Robert Brown in Prodromus Florae Novae Hollandiae in 1810. The specific epithet insulare is a Latin word meaning "from an island".

Distribution and habitat
Myoporum insulare occurs in coastal areas of New South Wales, Victoria, South Australia, Western Australia and Tasmania. In New South Wales it occurs from Eden southward, although an isolated occurrence was recorded much further north on Brush Island. It is also found on Lord Howe Island. In Victoria it is found in coastal areas but also inland in the west of that state. Boobialla is common along the coast of South Australia and in Western Australia it occurs south from Shark Bay to the South Australian border. It grows in sandy soils, often between rocks or near sandstone. Myoporum insulare is invasive in several African countries and in the western coastal areas of the US. Invasive populations may include some other species of this genus. In South Africa this species is known as manatoka.

Uses

Horticulture
Myoporum insulare may be used as a fast-growing hedge or windbreak species which withstands coastal winds and drought. It is hardy in well-drained positions and is easily propagated from cuttings. It is also used as rootstock for propagating many Eremophila species.

Bush tucker
However, in most states in Australia it is illegal to collect the fruit of native plants in the wild.

References

insulare
Flora of New South Wales
Flora of South Australia
Flora of Tasmania
Flora of Victoria (Australia)
Flora of Lord Howe Island
Eudicots of Western Australia
Lamiales of Australia
Garden plants of Australia
Plants described in 1810
Taxa named by Robert Brown (botanist, born 1773)